, stylized as Yu-Gi-Oh! GO RUSH!!, is a Japanese anime series animated by Bridge. It is the eighth main anime series in the Yu-Gi-Oh! franchise, following Yu-Gi-Oh! Sevens.

The series premiered in Japan on April 3, 2022.

Plot

In Mutsuba Town, the birthplace of Rush Dueling, Yuhi and Yuamu meet an alien named Yudias who came to Earth to search for Rush Duel but knows nothing about it.

Media

Anime

On December 17, 2021, TV Tokyo announced that Yu-Gi-Oh! Go Rush!! would premiere on April 3, 2022, on TV Tokyo and BS TV Tokyo, with key staff members from Yu-Gi-Oh! Sevens returning for their respective positions: Nobuhiro Kondo is directing the series at Bridge, Toshimitsu Takeuchi is in charge of series' scripts, and Kazuko Tadano and Hiromi Matsushita are designing the characters.

Manga
On March 3, 2022, it was announced that Yu-Gi-Oh! Go Rush!! would be getting a manga in Saikyo Jump, written and illustrated by Sugita Naoya which launched on April 4, 2022.

Trading Card Game

A new monster Type for Rush Duels was introduced with the advent of the anime, named Galaxy. It is used by the protagonist, Yudias.

In August 2022, a new mechanic for Rush Duels debuted in the anime, known as Equip Spells. They were later released in October. These function similar to Equip Spells from the main game.

References

External links
Yu-Gi-Oh! Go Rush!! Official website at TV Tokyo 

Yu-Gi-Oh! Go Rush!!  at MyAnimeList

2022 anime television series debuts
Anime spin-offs
Bridge (studio)
School life in anime and manga
TV Tokyo original programming
Yu-Gi-Oh!
Yu-Gi-Oh!-related anime